Brigadier-General Frank George Mathias Rowley, (4 January 186628 July 1949) was a British Army officer and the 5th Commander of the Ceylon Defence Force from 1920 to 1927.

Rowley was educated at Highgate School. He was commissioned into the British Army as a lieutenant in The Duke of Cambridge's Own (Middlesex Regiment) on 30 January 1886, and promoted to captain on 21 February 1895. In 1901 he was commandant of the Poonamallee depot serving the Madras Army. The following year he was in October 1902 seconded for staff service, and appointed assistant adjutant-general in Rangoon.

He was appointed Commander of the Ceylon Defence Forces on 22 July 1920, and served until 8 February 1927. He was succeeded by Albion Earnest Andrews.

References

People educated at Highgate School
Commanders of the Ceylon Defence Force
British Army generals of World War I
Middlesex Regiment officers
Companions of the Order of the Bath
Companions of the Order of St Michael and St George
Companions of the Distinguished Service Order